The United Methodist Book of Worship (1992) is the official liturgy of The United Methodist Church.  It contains services for sacraments and rites of the church such as Holy Communion, Baptism, Confirmation, Marriage, Healing (anointing) Services, and Ordination.  The Book of Worship also contains the daily office or "Praise and Prayer" services for Morning, Midday, Evening, and Night, as well as prayers, services, Scripture readings, and resources for various special days throughout the Christian year.

John Wesley, Anglican priest and founder of early Methodism, gave American Methodism its first worship book in The Sunday Service of the Methodists; With Other Occasional Services [London, 1784], a revision of The Book of Common Prayer, that has shaped Methodist worship ever since.  As acknowledged in the Preface, this Anglican influence can still been seen in The Book of Worship.  Much of the structure and content is ultimately derived from The Book of Common Prayer and the Anglican heritage, while also being informed by a diversity of other spiritual sources from across the world as well.  Also of interest is the National Methodist Student Movement's 1937 [Nashville, TN] publication of The Wesley Orders of Common Prayer, similarly sourced.

See also 

The Sunday Service of the Methodists; With Other Occasional Services
Book of Worship for Church and Home (1965)
Covenant Renewal Service
Articles of Religion (Methodist)
Explanatory Notes Upon the New Testament

References

The United Methodist Book of Worship (1992). Online edition.

British non-fiction books
Christian liturgical texts
Methodism
1992 non-fiction books
1992 in Christianity